Stephen, Steve, or Steven Brooks may refer to:

Entertainment
 Stephen Brooks (actor) (1942–1999), American film and television actor
 Steve Brooks (singer), American folk singer/songwriter
 Steve Brooks, guitarist for American metal band Torche
 Steven Brooks (born 1971), former Kidsongs kid
 Stephen Brooks, fictional title character of the 1969 film Hannibal Brooks
 Steve Brooks, fictional superhero known as the Stunt-Master

Sports
 Steve Brooks (basketball), American basketball player
 Steve Brooks (jockey) (1922–1979), American Hall of Fame jockey
 Steve Brooks (rower) (born 1948), American rower at the 1968 Summer Olympics
 Steven Brooks (lacrosse) (born 1984), American lacrosse player
 Steve Brooks, pseudonyme of Philippe Haezebrouck, French motosport driver

Other
 Stephen Brooks (academic), American associate professor of government
 Steve Brooks (entomologist) (before 1976 – after 2014), British entomologist
 Steve Brooks (statistician) (born 1970), British statistician
 Steven Brooks (Nevada politician), former American politician
 Stephen A. Brooks, founder of Brooks Instrument

See also
Stephen Brookes (born 1956), English cricketer
Brooks Stevens (1911–1995), American industrial designer